The Dr. Beattie Martin Trophy is a Canadian Football League award, given to the most outstanding Canadian player in the West Division.  Each team nominates a player for this award, from which the winner is chosen.  Either the winner of this trophy or the winner of the Lew Hayman Trophy will also win the Canadian Football League Most Outstanding Canadian award.

The Martin trophy is named after former Saskatchewan Roughriders president Beattie Martin.  Originally presented in 1949, it served as the Western Interprovincial Football Union's award for the outstanding Canadian rookie until 1974.  As part of the failed American expansion, the Martin trophy was awarded in 1995 to the North Division's outstanding Canadian.

For Outstanding Canadian Player of the West Division (1974–present)

 2022 – Nathan Rourke (QB), BC Lions
 2021 – Boseko Lokombo (LB), BC Lions
 2020 – season cancelled - covid 19
 2019 - Cameron Judge (LB), Saskatchewan Roughriders
 2018 - Andrew Harris (RB), Winnipeg Blue Bombers
 2017 - Andrew Harris (RB), Winnipeg Blue Bombers
 2016 - Jerome Messam (RB), Calgary Stampeders
 2015 - Jamaal Westerman (LB), Winnipeg Blue Bombers
 2014 - Jon Cornish (RB), Calgary Stampeders
 2013 - Jon Cornish (RB), Calgary Stampeders
 2012 - Jon Cornish (RB), Calgary Stampeders
 2011 - Jerome Messam (RB), Edmonton Eskimos
 2010 - Andy Fantuz (SB), Saskatchewan Roughriders 
 2009 - Ricky Foley (DE), BC Lions
 2008 - Kamau Peterson (WR), Edmonton Eskimos
 2007 - Jason Clermont (SB), BC Lions
 2006 - Brent Johnson (DE), BC Lions
 2005 - Brent Johnson (DE), BC Lions
 2004 - Jason Clermont (SB), BC Lions
 2003 - Chris Szarka (FB), Saskatchewan Roughriders
 2002 - Sean Millington (RB), BC Lions
 2001 - Cameron Legault (DT), BC Lions
 2000 - Sean Millington (RB), BC Lions
 1999 - Jamie Taras (C), BC Lions
 1998 - Vince Danielsen (SB), Calgary Stampeders
 1997 - Sean Millington (FB), BC Lions
 1996 - Leroy Blugh (DE), Edmonton Eskimos
 1995 - Larry Wruck (LB), Edmonton Eskimos
 1994 - Larry Wruck (LB), Edmonton Eskimos
 1993 - Dave Sapunjis (SB), Calgary Stampeders
 1992 - Ray Elgaard (SB), Saskatchewan Roughriders
 1991 - Blake Marshall (FB), Edmonton Eskimos
 1990 - Ray Elgaard (SB), Saskatchewan Roughriders
 1989 - Jeff Fairholm (SB), Saskatchewan Roughriders
 1988 - Ray Elgaard (SB), Saskatchewan Roughriders
 1987 - Nelson Martin (DS), BC Lions
 1986 - Joe Poplawski (SB), Winnipeg Blue Bombers
 1985 - Joe Poplawski (SB), Winnipeg Blue Bombers
 1984 - Joe Poplawski (SB), Winnipeg Blue Bombers
 1983 - Paul Bennett (DB), Winnipeg Blue Bombers
 1982 - Rick House (SB), Winnipeg Blue Bombers
 1981 - Joe Poplawski (SB), Winnipeg Blue Bombers
 1980 - Dave Fennell (DT), Edmonton Eskimos
 1979 - Dave Fennell (DT), Edmonton Eskimos
 1978 - Joe Poplawski (WR), Winnipeg Blue Bombers
 1977 - Gord Paterson (TE), Winnipeg Blue Bombers
 1976 - Bill Baker (DE), BC Lions
 1975 - Tom Forzani (WR), Calgary Stampeders
 1974 - Rudy Linterman (WR), Calgary Stampeders

Outstanding Canadian player in the West Division prior to 1974

 1973 – Dave Cutler (K), Edmonton Eskimos
 1972 – Jim Young (WR), BC Lions
 1971 – Dick Dupuis (DB), Edmonton Eskimos
 1970 – Jim Young (WR), BC Lions
 1969 – Jim Young (WR), BC Lions
 1968 – Ken Nielsen (F), Winnipeg Blue Bombers
 1967 – Terry Evanshen (WR), Calgary Stampeders
 1966 – Terry Evanshen (WR), Calgary Stampeders
 1965 – Larry Robinson (DB), Calgary Stampeders
 1964 – Larry Robinson (DB), Calgary Stampeders

 1963 – Dale West (DB), Saskatchewan Roughriders
 1962 – Harvey Wylie (DB), Calgary Stampeders
 1961 – Tony Pajaczkowski (OG), Calgary Stampeders
 1960 – Tony Pajaczkowski (OG), Calgary Stampeders
 1959 – Don Getty (QB), Edmonton Eskimos
 1958 – Gord Rowland (LB), Winnipeg Blue Bombers
 1957 – Gerry James (RB), Winnipeg Blue Bombers
 1956 – Normie Kwong (RB), Edmonton Eskimos
 1955 – Normie Kwong, Edmonton Eskimos & Gerry James, Winnipeg Blue Bombers
 1954 – Gerry James (RB), Winnipeg Blue Bombers

For Outstanding Rookie Player of the WIFU and the Western Football Conference (1949–1973)

 1973 - Lorne Richardson (DB), Saskatchewan Roughriders
 1972 - Walt McKee (K/P), Winnipeg Blue Bombers
 1971 - Bob Kraemer (WR), Winnipeg Blue Bombers
 1970 - John Senst (WR), Winnipeg Blue Bombers
 1969 - Dave Easley (DB), BC Lions
 1968 - Dave Cranmer (RB), Calgary Stampeders
 1967 - Ted Gerela (K), BC Lions
 1966 - Garry Lefebvre (WR/P), Edmonton Eskimos
 1965 - Ron Forwick (DE), Edmonton Eskimos
 1964 - Billy Cooper (WR), Winnipeg Blue Bombers
 1963 - Peter Kempf (K/TE), BC Lions
 1962 - Ted Frechette (DB/RB), Edmonton Eskimos

 1961 - Larry Robinson (DB), Calgary Stampeders
 1960 - Neal Beaumont (DB), BC Lions
 1959 - Henry Janzen (DB), Winnipeg Blue Bombers
 1958 - Walt Radzick (DT), Calgary Stampeders
 1957 - Mike Lashuk (FB), Edmonton Eskimos
 1956 - Norm Rauhaus (DB), Winnipeg Blue Bombers
 1955 - Harry Lunn (HB), Saskatchewan Roughriders
 1954 - Lynn Bottoms (HB), Calgary Stampeders
 1953 - Gordon Sturtridge (DE), Saskatchewan Roughriders
 1952 - Lorne Benson (FB), Winnipeg Blue Bombers
 1951 - Jim Chambers (HB), Edmonton Eskimos
 1950 - Gordon Brown (DG), Calgary Stampeders
 1949 - John Stroppa (HB), Winnipeg Blue Bombers

''See Jackie Parker Trophy to view other recipients of an award given to the most outstanding rookie in the West Division.

References
CFL Publications: 2011 Facts, Figures & Records

Canadian Football League trophies and awards